Radio 2 is a Belgian radio channel operated by the Flemish public broadcaster Vlaamse Radio- en Televisieomroep (VRT).

Radio 2 describes itself as "the largest family in Flanders". It offers a broad choice of music with the focus on Dutch speaking and Flemish productions. By offering this kind of music, information and entertainment Radio 2 attracts a wide audience. The Radio 2 programmes focus on the daily life topics of its listeners as well as important social issues.

The regional programmes put special attention on local news. The channel’s news and information programmes concentrate on regional and national politics, culture, economy and sport.

Logos and identities

Regional variations
Radio 2 is broadcast in five regional versions, each with its own regional news bulletins (up to 6 per day) and dedicated sequences at breakfast time (Start je dag, Mon–Fri, 6-8) and midday (De Middag, Mon–Fri, 12-13).  The five regions concerned are:

Radio 2 Antwerpen
Based in: Antwerp, Antwerp
Frequencies: 97.5 FM
Presenters: Nathalie Allard, Els Broekmans, Jelle Cleymans, Maarten Cox, Sam De Meulder, Kris Luyten, Sharon Slegers, Nathalie Sterckx, Tine Van Hauteghem

Radio 2 Limburg
Based in: Hasselt, Limburg
Frequencies: 97.9 FM
Presenters: Sander Beusen, Eva Droogmans, Daan Masset, Kaat Mendonck, Leen Paredis

Radio 2 Oost-Vlaanderen
Based in: Ghent, East Flanders
Frequencies: 89.8, 90.7 and 98.6 FM
Presenters: Ilse De Roeck, Dirk Ghys, Peter Hermans, Geert Houck, Nico Teirlinck, Niki Vandriessche, Joyce Verdonck, Jasper Verhulst

Radio 2 Vlaams-Brabant
Based in: Leuven, Flemish Brabant
Frequencies: 88.7, 92.4 and 93.7 FM
Presenters: Catherine Callens, Jeroen Guns, Catherine Lekime, Kristel Smout

Radio 2 West-Vlaanderen
Based in: Kortrijk, West Flanders
Frequencies: 100.1 FM
Presenters: Nico Blontrock, Margot Derycke, Jens Lemant, Herbert Verhaeghe

Charts

The Ultratop 50 chart for Flanders has existed separately from the Ultratop Wallonia chart since 31 March 1995. Prior to 1995, the official IFPI Belgium charts which covered both the French speaking part of Belgium (Wallonia) and the Dutch speaking part of Belgium (Flanders) were compiled based on shipments from distributors to retailers and not on sales from retailers to customers. However, this chart coexisted with a weekly Flemish chart that was based on actual sales from retailers to customers known as the Radio 2 Top 30 (previously known as the BRT Top 30) and which was broadcast by VRT, also known as BRT and BRTN. The VRT chart, also known as BRT and BRTN, was the most popular chart in Belgium with around one million listeners per week and was based on sales from up to 100 stores in Belgium. After Ultratop started publishing the official charts in 1995, Radio 2 started publishing and broadcasting the Ultratop charts. The charts archived on the Ultratop website from before when Ultratop started compiling the charts in 1995 are taken from the book Het Belgisch hitboek: 45 jaar hits in Vlaanderen: 1954-1999 by Robert Collin which in turn uses a variety of sources.

References

External links

 Radio 2
 Listen to Radio 2

Dutch-language radio stations in Belgium
Radio stations established in 1983